International Italian School "Leonardo da Vinci" is an Italian international school in Bulaq, Cairo, Egypt. It serves preschool, primary school, lower secondary school, and upper secondary school.

A secular Italian school opened in Bulaq in 1868; it is the predecessor of the current ISI "Leonardo da Vinci".

References

External links

 International Italian School "Leonardo da Vinci"
  International Italian School "Leonardo da Vinci"
  International Italian School "Leonardo da Vinci"

Italian international schools in Africa
International schools in Cairo